Polish Old Catholicism is the form of Old Catholicism which is based on Polish religious and cultural traditions.

See also 

 Catholic Mariavite Church
 Old Catholic Church in Poland
 Old Catholic Mariavite Church
 Polish-Catholic Church of Republic of Poland
 Polish National Catholic Church

References

Further reading 
 A. Jemielita, Inny katolicyzm: o starokatolikach i ich próbach demokratyzacji Kościoła, "Dalej!" 2011, nr 44, s. 53–74.
 Mały Rocznik Statystyczny Polski 2017, Warszawa 2017, s. 115.
 W. Słomski, Polscy starokatolicy, Warszawa 1997.    
 W. Wysoczański, Polski nurt starokatolicyzmu, Warszawa 1977.
 W. Wysoczański, Z badań nad polskim nurtem starokatolicyzmu, "Rocznik Teologiczny ChAT" 2016, z. 4, s. 637–656.

Catholicism in Poland
Old Catholicism